The GE U36B was a four-axle  B-B diesel-electric locomotive produced by General Electric from 1969 to 1974. It was primarily used by the Seaboard Coast Line Railroad and its successors, although thirteen provided the power for the original Auto Train. The U36B was the last GE high-horsepower universal series locomotive.

Design 
General Electric's "high-horsepower" universal series locomotives were built around improvements to the 16-cylinder GE FDL-16 prime mover. The locomotives rode on Blomberg trucks from traded-in EMD general-purpose (GP) locomotives. In common with other high-horsepower locomotives of its generation the U36B had large "bat-wing" radiators at the rear.

The U36B and the six-axle GE U36C were designed to operate with the MATE (Motors for Additional Tractive Effort) slug. The MATE had four traction motors, allowing power from the locomotive to be distributed over a total of eight traction motors for double tractive effort. The Auto-Train locomotives did not have steam generators for passenger comfort; this was supplied by a separate steam generator car behind the locomotives.

History 
The primary purchaser of the U36B was the Seaboard Coast Line Railroad, which ordered 108 locomotives. The Auto-Train Corporation, whose Auto Train ran primarily over the Seaboard, ordered another 17, for a total production run of 125. Four of these would be delivered to Conrail after Auto-Train ran into financial difficulties. The Conrail U36B locomotives were fitted with AAR Type B trucks. The unit price was $285,000. The intended use of the U36B was "high-priority, fast freight services, such as intermodal trains."

GE manufactured the U36B between January 1969 and December 1974, during a period when railroads in the United States moved away from high-horsepower designs. There were multiple reasons for this change: rising fuel prices because of the 1973 oil crisis, higher locomotive maintenance costs, and poor wheel adhesion, resulting from the primitive state of wheel-slip control at the time. GE would not market another such type until the Dash 7 series in the late 1970s.

Seaboard No. 1776 was painted in a red-white-and-blue color scheme to honor the United States Bicentennial and made numerous special trips. The 13 Auto-Train locomotives were painted in that company's distinctive purple-white-and-red color scheme, devised by Carol Settles. Amtrak leased car six of Auto-Train's locomotives during the unusually harsh winter of 1976–1977 to provide power for the Chicago–Florida Floridian.

At least one U36B has been preserved at the Lake Shore Railway Historical Society Museum.

Original owners
General Electric manufactured 125 locomotives between 1969–1975:

See also
 GE Universal Series
 GE B36-7

Notes

References

External links

B-B locomotives
U36B
Diesel-electric locomotives of the United States
Railway locomotives introduced in 1969
Standard gauge locomotives of the United States